Hédi Fried (née Szmuk; 15 June 1924 – 19 November 2022) was a Swedish-Romanian author and psychologist. A Holocaust survivor, she passed through Auschwitz as well as Bergen-Belsen, coming to Sweden in July 1945 with the boat M/S Rönnskär.

Fried died in November 2022, at the age of 98.

Awards

 The Seraphim Medal (Sweden: 2019)
 The Medal Illis Quorum in gold of the 8th size (Sweden; 1998)
Officer's Cross of the Order of Merit of the Federal Republic of Germany (2017)
Knight of the Order of the Star of Romania (2016)
The Swedish Europe-movement award European of the Year (1997)
Natur & Kultur Culture Award (1998)
Swedish Peace and Arbitration Society's Eldh-Ekblad Peace Prize (1999)
Honorary Doctor of Stockholm University (2002)
Raoul Wallenberg Academy's award Raoul Wallenberg Prize (2015)
Olof Palme Prize from the Olof Palme Memorial Fund (2017)

Books of Hédi Fried 

1992 – Skärvor av ett liv. Vägen till och från Auschwitz, Natur & Kultur, 
1995 – Livet tillbaka, Natur & Kultur, 
2002 – Ett tredje liv: från jordbävning i själen till meningsfull tillvaro, Natur & Kultur, 
2003 – Livets pendel. Fragment, erfarenheter, insikter, Lärarhandledning Natur & Kultur, 
2017 – Frågor jag fått om Förintelsen, Natur & Kultur, 
2019 – Historien om Bodri, Natur & Kultur,

References

External links 

1924 births
2022 deaths
People from Sighetu Marmației
Romanian emigrants to Sweden
Auschwitz concentration camp survivors
Bergen-Belsen concentration camp survivors
Romanian Jews
Swedish Jews
Officers Crosses of the Order of Merit of the Federal Republic of Germany
Knights of the Order of the Star of Romania
Swedish women writers
Recipients of the Illis quorum
Stockholm University alumni
Jewish writers